James Hutchison may refer to:

James Hutchison (American politician) (born 1942), former Mayor of Dover, Delaware, from 1994 to 2004
James Hutchison (Australian politician) (1859–1909), member of the Australian Federal House of Representatives
Sir James Hutchison, 1st Baronet (1893–1979), British Army officer and politician
James Holmes Hutchison (1912–1987), British professor of child health

See also
James Hutchinson (disambiguation)